Municipal elections were held in Kuwait on 21 May 2022. Thirty-eight candidates including one woman ran in eight constituencies. The elections were held in 443 committees distributed over 76 schools. The number of registered voters were 438,283. Only one candidate applied in each of the seventh and tenth constituencies, which as per local laws governing the voting process will give them automatic victory.

References

Municipal
Elections in Kuwait